There are two species of bird named streaked antwren:

Guianan streaked antwren, Myrmotherula surinamensis
Amazonian streaked antwren, Myrmotherula multostriata

Birds by common name